Duke of Camerino  is a title of nobility, originally in Papal peerage. It was created on 1503 by Apostolic authority of Pope Alexander VI and cardinal council over the ancient Marquissate of Camerino, which was part of the Dukedom of Spoleto.

History 
Camerino was a Welf Marquissate, under Varano family, its rulers participated in all conflicts between Ghibellines and Welfs. Meanwhile, Cesar Borgia was in Rome making his final plans for his intervention in Tuscany, in Camerino the Lord of Faenza Manfredo Astorre, fidelity at Papal authority is found floating in the Tiber, he had been strangled.

On 5 June Pope Alexander VI, excommunicated Giulio Cesare Varano, ruler of Camerino, accusing him of giving help to enemies of holy church. On 23 June Cesar Borgia left Rome with an army of 8000 troops. On 20 July Cesar Borgia carrying the Apostolic authority, took Camerino and Giulio Cesare Varano prisoner. On 25 July and after Alexander VI and cardinal council received notice of Camerino's capture, Cesar Borgia is invested by Apostolic authority and by cardinal council as Duke of Camerino, being first time in history the denomination is used over the Camerino city and region of Camerino.

Background 
Cesar Borgia left then Dukedom of Camerino to his brother Giovanni Borgia, was named later Duke of Nepi and Duke of Pallestrina by Apostolic authority. Giovanni Borgia carried many other titles and he did after death of Alexander VI a career as ambassador. He died on November, 1555 in Genoa being ambassador of Pope Paul III. The Dukedom of Camerino right remained in hands of Giovanni Borgia until his death when it passed to another branch of the Borgia family in reason of patrimony formed by him under the Sicilian and Spanish crowns because he had three daughters and no sons.

On 1503 Pope return Camerino to Juan Maria Varano in quality of Lord under Papal dukedom domine. On 1521 Juan, Lord of Camerino was deposed by his brother Segismund and he was reposed again in 1522. On 1534 Camerino is integrated to Dukedom of Spoleto but the ruler and Lady of Camerino was deposed by Pope on 1535, date in which is returned in quality of Marquissate to Ercole Varano for return to the Pope again in 1540 who gave Camerino to Octavio Farnesio, Duke of Parma.

Camerino was a policy piece in hands of Popes whose used it in pursuit policy alliances until 1555; in which the region remained definitely joined to Papal states until 1860, year which Camerino passed to new Kingdom of Italy.

The title of Duke of Camerino remained then in hands of Borgia family; nevertheless, it was used by the popes without permission of Giovanni Borgia and his descendants. Giovanni Borgia received rents of Camerino until his death, the dukedom right passed to a branch of the House of Borgia.

Dukes of Camerino 
 Cesar Borgia, Prince of Andria, Prince of Venafro, Duke of Valentinois, Duke of Romagna created by apostolic authority and cardinals council, Duke of Urbino, Count of Dyois, Duke of Camerino by apostolic authority and cardinal council and Lord of Imola, Forlì, Sassoferrato, Fermo, Fano, Cesena, Pesaro, Rimini, Faenza, Montefiore, Sant'Arcangelo, Verucchio, Catezza, Savignano, Meldola, Porto Cesenatico, Tossignano, Salaruolo, Monte Battaglia, Forlimpopoli, Bertinoro.
 Giovanni Borgia, Prince of Rome, Duke of Nepi, Duke of Camerino.
 House of Borgia. Title of Duke of Camerino is part of "Mayorazgo" instituted by Pope Alexander VI (Rodrigo Borgia).

Rulers under Papal domine
 Juan Maria Varano
 Segismund Varano
 Juan María Varano
 Duke of Spoleto
 Octavio Farnesio, Duke of Parma
 Ercole Varano

Papal rulers
 From 1555 (Pope Paul III)
 Until 1860 (Pope Pius IX)

Kingdom of Italy
 Camerino was part of the Papal States until Pius IX formally handed the Kingdom of Italy, where it remained as a province until the creation of the Republic of Italy, which is part within the Province of Macerata, Marche region.

According to the laws of the Italian Republic, the titles of nobility of Italy ceased to exist with the fall of the monarchical regime.

Citations

General sources 

 John W. Barker and Christopher Kleinhenz. "Camerino, Duchy of", Medieval Italy: An Encyclopedia, ed. Christopher Kleinhenz (London and New York: Routledge, 2004), p. 173.
 John E. Law. "The Ending of the Duchy of Camerino", Italy and the European Powers: The Impact of War, 1500–1530, ed. Christine Shaw (Leiden and Boston: Brill, 2006), pp. 77–90.
 John E. Law. "The Da Varano Lords of Camerino as Condottiere Princes", Mercenaries and Paid Men, ed. John France (Leiden and Boston: Brill, 2008), pp. 89–104.

Camerino
History of le Marche
Italian Noble titles
Italian princes
Nobles of the Holy See
Princes of the Papal States
Spanish noble families